Morning Glory is a compilation album by Tim Buckley. The album is a compilation of the Buckley's 1968 John Peel session (see Peel Sessions) and two further tracks ("Honeyman" and Fred Neil's "Dolphins") taken from the May 21, 1974 performance for, BBC TV music series, The Old Grey Whistle Test. The performance of "Dolphins" is also available as a video on 2007 DVD release Tim Buckley: My Fleeting House.

Morning Glory should not be confused with 2001 release Morning Glory: The Tim Buckley Anthology.

Track listing
All songs by Tim Buckley unless stated otherwise:
(* by Larry Beckett/Tim Buckley)

"Dolphins" (Fred Neil) – 3:11
"Honey Man"* – 5:01
"Morning Glory"* – 3:17
"Coming Home to You (Happy Time)"– 2:56
"Sing a Song for You" – 2:28
"Hallucinations/Troubadour"* – 10:35
"Once I Was" – 3:57

Personnel
Tracks 1-2:
Tim Buckley - Guitar, Vocals
Charlie Whitney - Guitar
Tim Hinkley - Bass
Ian Wallace - Drums

Tracks 3-7:
Tim Buckley – Guitar, Vocals
Lee Underwood – Guitar
Carter Collins – Percussion
Tony Carr - Drums

References

External links
BBC John Peel Archive

Tim Buckley compilation albums
1994 compilation albums
BBC Radio recordings